To Be Continued... is a 1986 album by American R&B vocal group The Temptations released on June 17, 1986 by Motown Records' Gordy label. The album featured the group's third top ten R&B hit of the 1980s, "Lady Soul", which reached No. 4 R&B and No. 47 pop. It was the third and final album to feature Ali-Ollie Woodson during his first stint with the group. The following year he was replaced by Dennis Edwards, then two years later rejoined the group replacing Edwards.

Track listing
Superscripts denote lead singers for each track: (a) Ali-Ollie Woodson, (b) Ron Tyson, (c) Richard Street, (d) Melvin Franklin, (e) Otis Williams.

Side A
"Lady Soul" (Mark Holden) – 5:02 a
"Message To The World" (Paul Fox, Franne Golde, Dennis Lambert) – 4:24 a
"To Be Continued" (Otis Williams, Ali-Ollie Woodson) – 5:01 a
"Put Us Together Again" (Gerard McMahon) – 3:55 c
"Someone" (Dave Anderson, Bill LaBounty) – 4:37 a

Side B
"Girls (They Like It)" (Peter Bunetta, Rick Chudacoff, Lenny Macaluso) – 4:37 a, b, c, d, e
"More Love, Your Love" (Mark Holden, Steve LeGassick) – 4:23 b
"A Fine Mess" (Dennis Lambert, Henry Mancini) – 4:04 a
"You're The One (Ron Tyson) - 4:39 d
"Love Me Right" (Richard Street, Otis Williams, Ali-Ollie Woodson) - 4:17 a

Charts

Weekly charts

Year-end charts

Singles

References

External links
 To Be Continued at Discogs

1986 albums
The Temptations albums
Gordy Records albums